Antonio Reguero Chapinal (born 4 July 1982) is a Spanish professional footballer who plays as a goalkeeper for Finnish club FC Lahti.

Club career
Born in Madrid, Reguero started playing football with Real Madrid. After two seasons with the C team he was promoted to the main squad, but suffered a serious knee injury. Subsequently released, he never played in higher than Segunda División B in his country, representing Villarreal CF B, Orihuela CF, Alicante CF, Mazarrón CF, UD Lanzarote, Racing de Ferrol and CF Gandía.

In June 2012, aged 30, Reguero moved abroad for the first time, signing for Inverness Caledonian Thistle of the Scottish Premier League. He made his league debut on 29 September, in a 4–0 win over Dundee United.

Reguero signed a pre-contract with Kilmarnock in April 2013. He left the club in the summer of 2014, having not played once during the season.

On 16 June 2014, Reguero joined Ross County. He played his first competitive game on 10 August, in a 1–2 home loss to St Johnstone.

On 27 December 2014, Reguero put on a Player of the match performance to help hold defending champions Celtic to a 0–0 draw at Celtic Park. He was one of 14 players released by Ross County at the end of the campaign, and in July 2015 he agreed to a one-year contract at Hibernian.

Reguero left Hibs in January 2016, having only played for the first team in pre-season friendlies. On 5 May, he signed a three-month contract with Veikkausliiga side Rovaniemen Palloseura. On 28 October 2019, he joined Helsingin Jalkapalloklubi in the same league on a one-year deal.

Reguero continued in Finland the following years, with FC Lahti.

References

External links

1982 births
Living people
Spanish footballers
Footballers from Madrid
Association football goalkeepers
Segunda División B players
Tercera División players
Real Madrid C footballers
Villarreal CF B players
Orihuela CF players
Alicante CF footballers
Racing de Ferrol footballers
CF Gandía players
Scottish Premier League players
Scottish Professional Football League players
Inverness Caledonian Thistle F.C. players
Kilmarnock F.C. players
Ross County F.C. players
Hibernian F.C. players
Veikkausliiga players
Rovaniemen Palloseura players
Helsingin Jalkapalloklubi players
FC Lahti players
Spanish expatriate footballers
Expatriate footballers in Scotland
Expatriate footballers in Finland
Spanish expatriate sportspeople in Scotland
Spanish expatriate sportspeople in Finland